Streptomyces clavifer is a bacterium species from the genus of Streptomyces which has been isolated from a Potato. Streptomyces clavifer produces melanostatin.

See also 
 List of Streptomyces species

Further reading

References

External links
Type strain of Streptomyces clavifer at BacDive -  the Bacterial Diversity Metadatabase

clavifer
Bacteria described in 1953